Fußballclub Gelsenkirchen-Schalke 04 e. V. is a German football club based in Gelsenkirchen, North Rhine-Westphalia. Since 1925, there have been fifty-six official managers, with the current incumbent, Manuel Baum, appointed on 30 September 2020.

Statistically, the club's most successful manager is Ralf Rangnick, during his first spell at the club, with a win percentage of 55.38. However, the club's most successful period came in the 1930s and the early 1940s, under the tenureship of Hans Schmidt and Otto Faist. It is likely Schmidt is actually the club's most successful manager, given the dominance that Schalke had at the time, but this cannot be proven due to the lack of statistics.

Managerial history

Although the club was founded in 1904, its first official manager was Heinz Ludewig, who was appointed in 1925. Schalke attained success through their style of play that used short, sharp, man-to-man passing to move the ball, later becoming famously known as the Schalker Kreisel. With the re-organisation of German football in 1933, under Nazi Germany, Schalke were placed in the Gauliga Westfalen. This period was their most successful decade in their history: from 1933 to 1942, the club would appear in 14 of 18 national finals (10 in the German championship and 8 in the Tschammerpokal) and win their league in every one of its eleven seasons.

After World War II, Schalke found it difficult to return to their earlier form, playing just twice in 1945. Club legends Ernst Kuzorra and Fritz Szepan managed the team during this period. They did gain some silverware towards the end of the 1950s, with the club winning the German championship in 1958, during Edi Frühwirth's tenureship. This however, has been the last championship won by the club, as Schalke have not won the Bundesliga since its inception in 1963.

Under Ivica Horvat, the club was close to winning the Bundesliga, finishing runners-up to Bayern Munich by three points in 1972, having led the league for most of the season. They did however, win the DFB-Pokal in the same season. The club was affected by the Bundesliga scandal of 1971, with several of its players banned for life. Though these sentences were later rescinded and commuted to bans ranging from six months to two years, the scandal had a profound effect on what might have possibly become one of the dominant German teams of the 1970s. In the 1980s, the club ran into trouble and were twice relegated to the 2.Bundesliga during the decade, firstly in 1983 under Jürgen Sundermann, and secondly in 1988 under Horst Franz.

Schalke returned to the Bundesliga in 1992, where they have remained ever since. Their most notable success in the 1990s was winning the UEFA Cup in 1997 under the guidance of Dutchman Huub Stevens. In the 2000s, and with Stevens still in charge, the club endured a similar season to 1972, with Schalke leading the league for most of the season, only to lose it again to Bayern, this time on goal difference. Like the 1971–72 season, the club won the DFB-Pokal cup. Afterwards, Schalke would be runners-up on three occasions, under Ralf Rangnick, Mirko Slomka and Felix Magath respectively, and were a regular competitor in the UEFA Champions League, reaching the semi-finals in 2011, during Rangnick's second spell with the club.

Managerial statistics

Pre-Bundesliga era

Bundesliga era
Key
Nat. = Nationality
M = Matches managed
W = Matches won
D = Matches drawn
L = Matches lost
Win% = Win ratio
Information correct as of 6 March 2023. Only competitive matches are counted.

Most league matches

References

External links
 FC Schalke 04 - Head Coaches on schalke04.de
 FC Schalke 04 - Trainerhistorie on kicker.de 
 FC Schalke 04 Manager History on worldfootball.net

Managers
 
Lists of football managers by club in Germany